Italian Rotors Industries Srl (IRI) was an Italian aircraft manufacturer based in Aprilia, Lazio. The company specialized in the design and manufacture of helicopters in the form ready-to-fly aircraft.

The firm was a società a responsabilità limitata, an Italian limited liability company.

The company seems to have been founded about 2013 and went out of business in June 2016.

The organization produced three helicopter models, all based upon the same general design. The IRI T22B is powered by an American-made four-cylinder, air-cooled, four stroke  Lycoming O-320-B2C aircraft engine. The IRI T23B employs the  Lycoming O-360-A2J powerplant. The IRI T250A is powered by a  PBS TS 100 turboshaft engine made by PBS Velká Bíteš of the Czech Republic.

Reviewer Werner Pfaendler, described the company's helicopter designs as "elegant".

Aircraft 
Summary of aircraft built by IRI:
IRI T22B
IRI T23B
IRI T250A

References

External links

Company website archives on Archive.org

Defunct aircraft manufacturers of Italy
Companies based in Lazio
Helicopters
Manufacturing companies established in 2013
Italian companies established in 2013
2016 disestablishments in Italy